Ramlan Hutahaean (7 September 195529 June 2021) was an Indonesian Lutheran minister. He was the 9th General Secretary of the Batak Christian Protestant Church (HKBP) between 2008 and 2012.

Early life 
Ramlan was born on 7 September 1955 in Sipahutar, a village located in North Tapanuli in Sumatra, Indonesia.

Evangelical career

Arrest and torture 
During the New Order regime of Indonesian President Suharto the military had a strong political role. In the mid-1990s the Indonesian government backed P. W. T. Simanjuntak to be the Ephorus (Chairman) of the Batak Christian Protestant Church, against a majority of church members who supported previous chairman S. A. E. Nababan. The conflict between the government wing, and opposition supporters, involved the military. Ramlan supported the latter and became the head of the church's personnel bureau in S. A. E. Nababan's administration. His support of S. A. E. Nababan resulted in his home in North Tapanuli being raided by around 150 soldiers on 12 May 1994. He was then arrested, tortured, and was held at a secret location along with two HKBP ministers and the son of an HKBP minister. Several days later, the police stated that Ramlan was arrested on charges of holding an illegal meeting, but refused to give any clarifications on his torture.

General Secretary of HKBP 

Ramlan was elected as the General Secretary of HKBP at its 59th General Synod (Sinode Godang) in September 2008. He defeated five other candidates in the election. After his four-year term as secretary general ended, Ramlan decided to run as a candidate for the church's Ephorus  in the next general synod in September 2012. He lost the election to W. T. P. Simarmata. He then attempted to run for a second term as secretary general, but he lost again, this time to Mori Sihombing.

During his tenure as General Secretary, a conflict relating to the establishment of a HKBP church in Ciketing, a subdistrict in Bekasi, occurred. A HKBP pastor from the nearby region was beaten by locals, while a local elder named Hasian Sihombing was stabbed by an unknown group. Ramlan and the Ephorus demanded the President of Indonesia at that time, Susilo Bambang Yudhoyono,  resolve the problem. Several days later, Ramlan went to the Ciketing HKBP church—which at that time has been sealed by locals—and led a mass in there.

Death 
Ramlan died on 29 June 2021 in Jakarta.

References 

Indonesian religious leaders
1955 births
2021 deaths
People from North Tapanuli Regency
People of Batak descent
Indonesian Lutherans